Odolina is a small settlement in the Municipality of Hrpelje-Kozina in the Littoral region of Slovenia.

The local church is dedicated to Saint Peter and belongs to the Parish of Brezovica.

Blind valley
Odolina is a located in a typical karst blind valley. At its upper end the terrain is flysch, and Brašnica Creek flows across the surface. When it reaches the limestone of the Slavnik syncline, the creek first cuts a short gorge into the limestone and then it disappears underground into a large cave.

Gallery

References

External links
Odolina on Geopedia

Populated places in the Municipality of Hrpelje-Kozina